Anthony Charles De Longis (born March 23, 1950) is an American actor, stuntman, and fight choreographer.

Life and career
De Longis was born in Glendale, California. He attended California State University, Northridge where he was initiated into the Phi Kappa Psi fraternity.

He is well known for his recurring role during the first two seasons of the TV series Star Trek: Voyager, as First Maje Jal Culluh, leader of the Kazon-Nistrim.

A very experienced swordsman, he is also known for his roles on Highlander: The Series, as Lymon Kurlow in the third-season episode "Blackmail", and as Otavio Consone in the fifth-season episode "Duende". De Longis auditioned and was considered for the lead role in the series. A martial artist and weapon master in several disciplines, he played a swordsman opposite Jet Li in the 2006 martial arts epic Fearless, and gave Harrison Ford extensive whip training for the 2008 film Indiana Jones and the Kingdom of the Crystal Skull. He also taught Michelle Pfeiffer how to use the bullwhip for her role as Catwoman in the 1992 film Batman Returns.

De Longis provided the voice of Marshal Leigh Johnson in the 2010 western video game, Red Dead Redemption. He also appeared in the downloadable content pack Red Dead Redemption: Undead Nightmare.

De Longis' best known film role was as the character Blade in the 1987 film Masters of the Universe, in which he was also Frank Langella's stunt double. He also portrayed Gary Ketchum in Road House,  performing featured fights against Patrick Swayze's Dalton.

He appeared as Claus Van Zandt in 1985 on the soap opera Days of Our Lives, and as Leo Mitchell in 1989 on Santa Barbara. He has also made guest appearances on many other TV series, including Battlestar Galactica (original series), V, Babylon 5, Queen of Swords, and MacGyver. De Longis provided his voice in a Star Trek video game. De Longis was the voice actor as the main antagonist Lord Zygon in Starchaser: The Legend of Orin on 1985 film.

De Longis was also the swordmaster and stunt co-ordinator on the first six production episodes of the syndicated TV series Queen of Swords (101-107, not 105). The Queen of Swords was portrayed by newcomer Tessie Santiago and he trained her for two months in pre-production in California in the use of the rapier and dagger in the Spanish mysterious circle (Destreza) style to give the heroine a unique fighting style. He had used this style in the episode "Duende" of Highlander: The Series. He also trained Santiago in the use of the whip before moving to Texas Hollywood, Almería, Spain for the filming of the series. He appears in episode 1, "Destiny", as Maestro Torres the fencing instructor of Tessa Alvarado and episode 16, "The Hanged Man", as the ruthless Krane of the title. In the series he trained guest stars Bo Derek and Cristián de la Fuente and also doubled for him.

In 1999, De Longis formed Palpable Hit Productions, a production company specializing in bladed weapons and bullwhip training videos. The initial productions presented swordplay for performance, but in 2002 branched out to include historically correct combative fencing techniques in conjunction with the Martinez Academy of Arms.

In 2009, De Longis appeared on an episode of the Deadliest Warrior as an expert for the weapons and tactics used by William Wallace.

In 2015, De Longis appeared on an episode of MythBusters, teaching Adam Savage and Jamie Hyneman how to use a bullwhip so they could test Indiana Jones myths.

In 2018, De Longis appeared as a guest on an episode of Good Mythical Morning in which he whipped Rhett McLaughlin on the buttocks.

Filmography

Acting

Film

Television

Video Games

Stunts/miscellaneous

Good Mythical Morning (2018) - volunteered in Rhett and Link's mirror-touch synesthesia experiment
MythBusters (2015) - helped teach Adam and Jamie how to use a bullwhip to test Indiana Jones myths
DC Nation Shorts (2011) - tested Green Arrow's boxing glove arrow
La Verdadera Destreza: The True Art and Style of Spanish Swordsmanship (1999/2001) (with Maestro Ramon Martinez)
Queen of Swords (2000) - first six production episodes as swordmaster/stunt co-ordinator
Final Round (1994)
Far and Away (1992)
Dangerously Close (1986)

See also
 Roberta Brown

References

External links
 
 

Action choreographers
Male actors from California
American male film actors
American male soap opera actors
American male television actors
American stunt performers
People from Greater Los Angeles
1950 births
Living people
20th-century American male actors
21st-century American male actors
People from Glendale, California